Sergei Nikolayevich Yushenkov (27 June 1950 – 17 April 2003) was a liberal Russian politician. He was assassinated on 17 April 2003, just hours after registering his political party to participate in the December 2003 parliamentary elections.

Political career
Yushenkov was an elected member of all Russian Parliaments from 1989 to 2003. During the Soviet coup attempt of 1991, he organized the "living chain" of civilians who came to protect their Parliament in Moscow, and he successfully negotiated with military personnel sent to storm the building.

As a person with a military background, Yushenkov was the strongest proponent of reform in the Russian Army, and he campaigned tirelessly to abolish  conscription, reduce the size of the Army, and protect all rights of  military personnel who suffered from abuse and dedovshchina. Yushenkov was a prominent critic of the First and Second Chechen Wars. He argued that Russian Army operates in Chechnya (a part of Russia) illegally.

His political party, Liberal Russia, was officially formed on October 22, 2002. The other initial organizers of this party before its registration were Vladimir Golovlyov, Viktor Pokhmelkin, and controversial businessman Boris Berezovsky. Vladimir Golovlyov was assassinated on 21 August 2002 (his killers were never found), and Boris Berezovsky was expelled, presumably on the request of State authorities who refused to register the party, and possibly due to tensions between the initial organizers of the party.

Investigation of Russian apartment bombings
Yushenkov was vice chairman of the Sergei Kovalyov commission formed to investigate the Russian apartment bombings, and his views that the Russian Federal Security Service (FSB) had orchestrated the bombings to generate public support for the Chechen War were similar to those of journalist David Satter, a Johns Hopkins University and Hoover Institute scholar. During his visit to the United States in April 2002, Yushenkov described a secret order issued by Boris Yeltsin to initiate the Second Chechen War, according to Alexander Goldfarb The order was issued in response to a demand from 24 Russian governors that the then-unpopular Yeltsin should transfer all state powers to Prime Minister Vladimir Putin. Yeltsin's order was dated September 23, 1999, the same day that FSB operatives were caught red-handed while planting a bomb in an apartment complex in the city of Ryazan (after which the sequence of bombings in several Russian cities suddenly stopped). The next day, Vladimir Putin began the military campaign in Chechnya. According to Yushenkov, Putin's rise to power represented a successful coup d'état organized by the FSB.

On 5 March 2002, Yushenkov flew to the premier of the documentary film Assassination of Russia in London. The film described Russian apartment bombings as a terrorism act committed by Russian state security services. He announced that his party Liberal Russia is going to distribute copies of the film around the country to demonstrate "how the secret services deceived Russian citizens".  Although some copies were confiscated by Russian Customs, tens of thousands of copies of the film were smuggled and distributed in Russia.

Investigation of Moscow theatre hostage crisis
Yushenkov also investigated the alleged involvement of the FSB in staging the Moscow theatre hostage crisis through their agent provocateur Khanpash Terkibaev, the only hostage taker who left the theater alive and allegedly guided the terrorists to the theater.  In the beginning of April 2003 former FSB Aleksander Litvinenko gave information about Terkibaev ("the Terkibaev file") to Sergei Yushenkov when he visited London. Yushenkov passed this file to Anna Politkovskaya.
A few days later Yushenkov was assassinated. Terkibaev was killed later in a car crash in Chechnya. While flying south in September 2004 to help negotiate with those who had taken over a thousand hostages in a school in Beslan (North Ossetia), Politkovskaya fell violently ill and lost consciousness after drinking tea. She had reportedly been poisoned, with some accusing the former Soviet secret police poison facility.

Assassination
Sergei Yushenkov was shot dead near his house in Moscow on 17 April 2003, just hours after finally obtaining the registrations needed for his Liberal Russia party to participate in the December 2003 parliamentary elections in 55 regions. His last known public utterance was "Registration has been completed.". Mikhail Trepashkin believed that Yushenkov was murdered because he was a leader of an opposition party that openly challenged the power of the FSB and Russian authorities. Moreover, Yushenkov promised voters an independent investigation of the Russian apartment bombings as a key issue of his election campaign (an interview of Trepashkin can be seen in director Andrei Nekrasov's documentary "Disbelief".

Just before his death, Sergei Yushenkov received threats from a high-ranking FSB general, Aleksander Mikhailov, according to Grigory Pasko.

Investigation
Four people have been convicted during a controversial trial for the murder of Sergei Yushenkov and are currently serving prison sentences. Most prominent among them is Mikhail Kodanev, a former co-chairman of the Liberal Russia party organized by Yushenkov himself. During the trial, Mikhail Kodanev strenuously claimed to be innocent. He later tried to commit suicide and was placed in the FSB's special Lefortovo prison. According to attorney Henry Reznick, Kodanev was convicted solely on the basis of the false testimony of another convicted suspect (Alexander Vinnik) who made a series of contradictory statements, including claims that Yushenkov was killed by the government.

Critics also insisted that the political murders of two chairmen of the Liberal Russia party should have been considered as the same case in the court, which would make it clear that some of the suspects were wrongly accused.  Some observers noted that Kodanev was relatively unknown in Russian politics until he was named to Yushenkov's party by Boris Berezovsky, ostensibly to make a mockery of Vladimir Putin (Kodanev was nicknamed "Putin" because he looks very much like the President). Some Russian media claimed that it was Boris Berezovsky who organized the murder of Sergei Yushenkov through his agent Mikhail Kodanev.

Former FSB officer Aleksander Litvinenko suggested that Sergei Yushenkov had been killed because he knew that FSB organized the Moscow theatre hostage crisis, consistent with a previous report by journalist Anna Politkovskaya.

References

External links

English
Russian liberal deputy shot dead –  BBC News
Yushenkov, a Russian idealist –  BBC News
Obituary –  The Independent
Moscow: Death of a deputy –  The Jamestown Foundation
Russian MP's death sparks storm –  BBC News
Russia buries slain deputy as concern mounts over political killings –  Agence France-Presse
Russian deputy assassinated –  Voice of America News
 Russia: High-Profile Killings, Attempted Killings In The Post-Soviet Period, Radio Free Europe, October 19, 2006

Russian
Sergei Yushenkov knew that he was a target of FSB assassination
Publications about the murder of Sergei Yushenkov
Interview with Radio Free Europe
Yushenkov on the Russian apartment bombings
List of members of Kovalyov commission
Yuri Shchekochikhin on the murder of Sergei Yushenkov
Opinions about death of Yushenkov

See also
Human rights in Russia
Yuri Shchekochikhin
Sergei Kovalyov
Alexander Litvinenko
Galina Starovoitova
Artyom Borovik

Assassinated Russian politicians
People murdered in Russia
Deaths by firearm in Russia
People from Tver Oblast
1950 births
2003 deaths
Burials at Vagankovo Cemetery
Russian dissidents
Russian human rights activists
First convocation members of the State Duma (Russian Federation)
Second convocation members of the State Duma (Russian Federation)
Third convocation members of the State Duma (Russian Federation)